The Bilala or Bulala are a Muslim people that live around Lake Fitri, in the Batha Prefecture, in central Chad. The last Chadian census in 1993 stated that they numbered 136,629 people. Their language, Naba, is divided in four dialects and is a part of the Central Sudanic language family; it is shared by two of their neighbours, the Kuka and the Medogo. These three peoples are collectively known as Lisi and are believed to be descendants of main ethnic groups of the Sultanate of Yao.

They first appeared in the 14th century near lake Fitri as a nomadic clan led by scions of the Sayfawa dynasty. They were originally a political entity that came about as a result of fusion of the Kayi (old Zaghawa = current Kanembu, the clan exist even today in Kanem) and Ngizimis Kanembu clan, which exists event today in Dibbinintchi, Lake Tchad inhabitants of the Fittri region. Settled east of the Kanem Empire, in today's Chad, they shattered the empire's power, killing five of six of Kanem's mais (kings) between 1376 and 1400.

At the end the Bulala conquered Kanem and forced the Kanem mais to migrate to Bornu. As a result, the Bulala put their hands on Kanem, founding in the 15th century the Muslim sultanate of Yao. The Kanem-Bornu Empire counter-attacked a century later under Ali Gazi. Kanem was retaken by Ali's son after a great battle at Garni Kiyala, forcing the Bulala to move east, where they were to remain a menace for centuries to Kanem-Bornu. It continued also to be a flourishing kingdom: the traveller Leo Africanus even thought that the Bulala's reign was richer than Kanem-Bornu for its prosperous trade with Egypt.

Their power survived in diminished forms until the onset of colonialism, when they submitted to the French.

References

External links
Notes sur les Bilala du Fitri (PDF, in French)

Kanem Empire
Ethnic groups in Chad
Muslim communities in Africa